The Antrim county hurling team represents Antrim GAA, the county board of the Gaelic Athletic Association, in the Gaelic sport of hurling. The team competes in the three major annual inter-county competitions; the All-Ireland Senior Hurling Championship, the Leinster Senior Hurling Championship and the National Hurling League. It also contests the Ulster Senior Hurling Championship when the competition is run, winning the latest title in 2017.

Antrim's home ground is Casement Park, Belfast. The team's manager is Darren Gleeson.

The team last won the Ulster Senior Championship in 2017, but has never won the All-Ireland Senior Championship or the National League.

The team is nicknamed the Saffrons, the Saffron men or the Glensmen.

History
Antrim is the only Ulster county to appear in an All-Ireland Senior Hurling Championship (SHC) final, the first of which was in 1943 losing to Cork and the second was in 1989 losing to Tipperary. In 1943 Antrim defeated both Galway (by 7–0 to 6–2) and Kilkenny (by 3–3 to 1–6) in the old Corrigan Park, but disappointed in the All-Ireland against Cork. Two years previously, Antrim had been graded Junior a year before, and had been beaten by Down in the Ulster final. It was only competing in the Senior Championship because the Junior grade was abolished. Antrim hurlers featured strongly in Ulster Railway cup final appearances in 1945, 1993 and 1995. In hurling, the progression that began with Loughgiel's success at club hurling level in 1983 (with players like 15-stone goalkeeper Niall Patterson) culminated in an All-Ireland final appearance in 1989.

Antrim's first All-Star, Ciaran Barr starred in a 4–15 to 1–15 All-Ireland semi-final win over Offaly in 1989. The final was one of the poorest on record, as stage fright overcame the Antrim team. It was no flash in the pan: Antrim failed by just two points against Kilkenny in the 1991 All-Ireland semi-final.

Antrim qualified for the 2020 Joe McDonagh Cup Final.

Current panel

 Team as of 4 June 2022, 2022 Joe McDonagh Cup final vs Kerry.
 Ryan Elliott
 David Kearney
 Gerard Walsh
 Paddy Burke
 Joe Maskey
 Eoghan Campbell
 Conall Bohill
 Michael Bradley
 Keelan Molloy
 James McNaughton
 Neil McManus
 Ciarán Clarke
 Conal Cunning
 Conor McCann
 Seaan Elliott

 Ryan McCambridge for E. Campbell
 Daniel McKernan for C. Bohill
 Domhnall Nugent for C. McCann
 Niall McKenna for J. McNaughton
 Conor Johnston for C. Clarke
 Eoin O'Neill for N. McManus

 Paul McMullan
 Stephen Rooney
 Phelim Duffin
 Mattie Donnelly
 Scott Walsh

Players

Notable players

Records

Top scorers

Neil McManus

All Stars
Antrim has 5 All Stars, as of 1993.

1988: Ciaran Barr
1989: Dessie Donnelly, Olcan McFetridge
1991: Terence McNaughton
1993: Paul McKillen

Team sponsorship
Antrim unveiled a sponsorship agreement with Fibrus in December 2022, projected to last five years.

Honours
Official honours, with additions noted.

National
All-Ireland Senior Hurling Championship
 Runners-up (2): 1943, 1989
All-Ireland Senior B Hurling Championship
 Winners (3): 1978, 1981, 1982
 Runners-up (1): 1974
All-Ireland Intermediate Hurling Championship
 Winners (1): 1970
All-Ireland Junior Hurling Championship
 Winners (1): 2002
 Runners-up (2): 1959, 1963
Joe McDonagh Cup
 Winners (2): 2020, 2022
 
Christy Ring Cup
 Winners (1): 2006
 Runners-up (2): 2016, 2017

National Hurling League Division 2
 Winners (4): 1956, 1970, 2003, 2020
Oireachtas Cup
 Winners (1):  1946
All-Ireland Vocational Schools Championship
 Winners (1): 1971

Provincial
Ulster Senior Hurling Championship
 Winners (58): 1900, 1901, 1903, 1904, 1905, 1907, 1909, 1910, 1911, 1913, 1916, 1924, 1925, 1926, 1927, 1928, 1929, 1930, 1931, 1933, 1934, 1935, 1936, 1937, 1938, 1939, 1940, 1943, 1944, 1945, 1946, 1947, 1948, 1949, 1989, 1990, 1991, 1993, 1994, 1996, 1998, 1999, 2002, 2003, 2004, 2005, 2006, 2007, 2008, 2009, 2010, 2011, 2012, 2013, 2014, 2015, 2016, 2017
 Runners-up (11): 1902, 1906, 1914, 1915, 1923, 1932, 1941, 1992, 1995, 1997, 2000
Walsh Cup
 Winners (1): 2008
Ulster Intermediate Hurling Championship
 Winners (5): 1966, 1967, 1969, 1970, 1973
Ulster Junior Hurling Championship
 Winners (15): 1950, 1951, 1952, 1953, 1954, 1955, 1957, 1958, 1959, 1961, 1963, 1966, 1968, 1969, 2002
Ulster Under-21 Hurling Championship
 Winners (24): 1964, 1965, 1966, 1967, 1970, 1972, 1973, 1974, 1976, 1978, 1979, 1980, 1981, 1982, 1988, 1989, 1991, 1992, 1994, 1995, 1996, 1998, 1999, 2000, 2002, 2006, 2009, 2010, 2011, 2012, 2013, 2014, 2015, 2016
Ulster Minor Hurling Championship
 Winners (56): 1931, 1933, 1935–41, 1945–56, 1958–66, 1969, 1970, 1986, 1987, 1988, 1992, 1993, 1995–99, 2000, 2001, 2002, 2003, 2004, 2005, 2006, 2007, 2008, 2009, 2010, 2011, 2013, 2014, 2015

References

 
County hurling teams